

Portugal
 Angola – 
 Military junta (1782–1784)
 José de Almeida e Vasconcellos de Soveral e Carvalho, Governor of Angola (1784–1790)
 Macau – Bernardo Aleixo de Lemos e Faria, Governor of Macau (1783–1788)

Colonial governors
Colonial governors
1784